Methylbenzaldehyde or tolualdehyde may refer to:

 2-Methylbenzaldehyde (2-tolualdehyde)
  (3-tolualdehyde)
 4-Methylbenzaldehyde (4-tolualdehyde)